The Ministry of Justice of the Republic of Uzbekistan,, is the central government body charged consistent implementation of a single state policy in the sphere of lawmaking and law enforcement practice in Uzbekistan.

History
People's Commissariat of Justice of Uzbekistan was established November 26, 1924 decision of the Revolutionary Committee based on the People's Commissariat of Justice of the Turkestan Autonomous Republic . One of its most important tasks was to coordinate and organize the activities of judicial authorities in the former states have joined the Uzbek Bukhara Emirate, and Khorezm Kokand khanate.

May 6, 1925 the Presidium of the CEC of Uzbekistan approved the Statutes of the People's Commissariat of Justice, to determine its structure and authority . According to Article 1 NKJU entrusted to : general management, organization and guidance of all judicial institutions, prosecution, investigation authorities, notaries and bailiffs, court approval in office workers; monitor the activities of land commissions and other institutions carrying out judicial functions, to monitor the activities boards defenders and management of legal assistance to the population, consideration of controversial issues on the delimitation of the competence of judicial authorities, on the one hand, and the other departments of the other; preliminary review of all introduced to the CEC and SNK Uzbekistan legislative proposals, monitoring of compliance with the law, the interpretation of existing laws, publication of collections of laws and orders of the government of the republic, etc.

People's Commissariat of Justice consisted of three main sections: the judicial system and supervision, prosecution, and the Department of legislative proposals. People's Commissar of Justice considered simultaneously and the State Prosecutor of the Republic, appoint and dismiss the CEC to report SNK Uzbek SSR .
December 22, 1926 Regulation of the People 's Commissariat of Justice of Uzbekistan was amended and supplemented, and October 11, 1931 replaced by a new, repeatedly changed in subsequent years due to changes in the structure and functions of the judicial and prosecutorial .

In the early 1930s of the People's Commissariat of Justice of the republic consisted of the Prosecutor's Office, Supreme Court, organizational and Instruction Department, the General Directorate of corrective labor institutions and the general department . Vice Commissar of Justice had to face the prosecutor of the Republic, President of the Supreme Court and the Chief of the corrective labor institutions .

NKJU tasked to the republic unified judicial policy, the organization and the overall supervision of the activities of all organs of justice, supervision over the legality of actions of officials and individuals. He led the investigation of all the organs in the fight against crime, the study of crime and ways to combat it. In conducting the People's Commissariat of Justice is to oversee special judicial institutions, as well as oversees all correctional labor practices in the country, etc.

The prosecutor's office was part of the Ministry of Justice of Uzbekistan until 1936.
Is administered by the People's Commissariat of Justice of the Union republics Penitentiary institutions moved, according to the decision of the CEC and SNK on October 27, 1934, with the introduction of the NKVD and its local bodies .
September 10, 1934 CEC and CPC Uzbek SSR adopted a decree "On the reorganization and strengthening of judicial and prosecution ", which changed the structure of some of the People's Commissariat of Justice, the Prosecutor's Office and the Supreme Court of Uzbekistan. NKJU consisted then of the Prosecutor's Office, the Supreme Court of the Republic and departments.

The final act of a centralized judicial and prosecutorial system was the decision of the CEC and SNK on July 20, 1936 "On the formation of the People's Commissariat of Justice of the USSR ." December 8, 1936 the CEC and SNK approved the Statute of the People's Commissariat of Justice of the USSR. Supreme Court of Uzbekistan was released from judicial control functions, he became only the highest supervisory authority of the republic.
Of reference of People 's Commissariat of Justice of the Union republics were seized all prosecutors and investigative agencies . At the Union- Republican People's Commissariat of Justice of the USSR entrusted the organization and management of judicial institutions.
The Regulation determines the structure of the People's Commissariat of Justice of Uzbekistan, which was headed by People's Commissar of having two deputies. As part NKJU Uzbek SSR departments were established judicial institutions, the department of judicial protection and legal assistance to the population sector notaries department Uzbek SSR codification of legislation, legal advice, etc. In addition, NKJU republic directed and oversaw the activities of bailiffs, organized and led the court statistics .

During the war in the structure of Justice has not changed significantly . Network of Justice of the Republic remained stable, although in separate links it endured adjustments related to changes in the administrative-territorial division of the republic, especially in wartime.

In accordance with the Decree of the Presidium of the Supreme Soviet of the Uzbek SSR on August 7, 1956 "On the Abolition of Justice Department of the Uzbek SSR in province Soviets " The Council of Ministers Uzbek SSR decision of 6 November 1956 approved the new Statute of the Ministry of Justice of the republic. According to the new Regulation Justice Uzbek SSR subordinated directly to the Council of Ministers. The ministry functioned Board comprising the Minister, his deputies and several senior officials who examined the practical management of the judicial institutions and judicial authorities, checking performance, recruitment, training major orders, instructions, etc.

March 23, 1959 for the purpose of "concentration of control over the activities of regional and national courts ", the Presidium of the Supreme Soviet UzSSR abolished the Ministry of Justice of the republic. The right to conduct an audit of the regional and national courts, to exercise control over all their activities, the responsibility for maintaining judicial statistics went to the Supreme Court Uzbek SSR . As a result of this reorganization as organs of judicial administration began to advocate higher courts .

The Council of Ministers of the Republic of 27 March 1959 at the latest Law Commission was established, which was entrusted with the work of codification and systematization of legislation, working on behalf of the government and made a preliminary review of the Council of Ministers the draft legislation and government decisions on regulatory nature .

However, subsequent events have shown that this approach was wrong, was the result of a voluntary approach to the practice of state-building. As a consequence, the quality was damaged preparation of legislation . Adversely affected by this reorganization and staffing of legal professionals . In this regard, the Presidium of the Supreme Soviet of the USSR August 31, 1970 issued a decree " On the Formation of the Union- republic's Ministry of Justice of the USSR ."
In accordance with October 1, 1970 the Presidium of the Supreme Soviet of the Uzbek SSR issued a decree " On the Formation of the Union- republic's Ministry of Justice of the Uzbek SSR ." The provision to it was approved by Council of Ministers Uzbek SSR 27 September 1972. The Ministry of Justice organizational leadership by the Supreme Court of Karakalpakstan Autonomous Republic, regional, Tashkent city, district (city) people's courts, the work on organizing and preparing proposals for codification of legislation Uzbek SSR, providing methodological guidance legal work in the national economy, guidance and coordination of public bodies and public organizations to promote legal knowledge and clarifying the law of population, business notaries, Tashkent research Institute forensic and general management of the organs of civil status and legal profession Uzbek SSR.

In 70–80 years of significant changes in the structure and competence of the governing bodies of justice has occurred. Ministry of Justice Uzbek SSR provides organizational support of the courts, during which addressed the formation of the judiciary, selection, placement and training of personnel of the judiciary and the courts, creating normal conditions for the implementation of the courts of justice, was organized statements of judges and people 's assessors before voters, conducted general checks organization of work in the district, municipal and provincial courts, authorities and institutions of justice.

During these years, the Ministry of Justice, its local bodies, in coordination with other law enforcement agencies studied jurisprudence on certain categories of criminal cases and take measures to correct deficiencies. In particular, it summarizes judicial practice in cases of embezzlement, bribery and speculation, violation of safety rules, judicial and prosecutorial practice for the release of property from seizure ( exclusion from the inventory), checked the law enforcement agencies to combat the theft of state and public property, postscripts and speculation, studied the state of administrative and financial authorities on compensation of material damage in cases of theft of state property, etc.

Board of the Ministry of Justice has repeatedly discussed the work of legal services, ministries, agencies, organizations and businesses to comply with legislation on the protection of women and minors . The focus of the Ministry of Justice and the courts of the Republic were the problem of effective use of legal means for the prevention of violations of the rights and legitimate interests of citizens.
Employees of the judiciary and law courts conducted propaganda among the population. Were judges, notaries, lawyers, legal scholars . The Ministry of Justice has used this form of work and how the analysis of the theme and content of legal publications in the national newspapers and to make proposals to strengthen their activities.

Improving the performance of Justice and courts largely depended on their working conditions and logistics . These institutions bring in significant revenue local budgets, and their content is not local funds were, of the national budget allocated small amounts . Many courts, notaries and registry office located in emergency or unsuitable premises . Lacked paper, typewriters, office equipment, furniture, etc., and the number of states was almost twice lower than the standard .
In 1991, the people of Uzbekistan gained independence . Its historical significance lies primarily in the fact that it enshrines a commitment to human rights and the principles of state independence, puts the task of creating a humane and democratic state of law. During the period of lawful state significantly increases the role of the Ministry of Justice as sole legal body of the republic . In order to enhance the role and responsibility of Justice, activation of legislative activity, improve legal services to the population, protection of constitutional rights and legitimate interests of citizens of the Republic of Uzbekistan President January 8, 1992 issued a decree "On improvement of the Ministry of Justice ." On this basis, the Cabinet of Ministers Decree Republic of Uzbekistan on November 12, 1992 adopted Resolution № 523 " On issues of improvement activities of the Ministry of Justice ."

This Decision Union- Republican Ministry of Justice of the Uzbek SSR was transformed into the Ministry of Justice, was also approved the structure of the central apparatus of the Ministry of Justice and the new Regulations .

To further improve the activity of the Ministry of Justice to ensure the implementation of the unified state policy in the area of law and practice, as well as the implementation of the protection of constitutional rights and freedoms Cabinet of Ministers August 27, 2003 adopted Resolution № 370 "On measures for further improvement of Ministry of Justice of the Republic of Uzbekistan. "
Ministry is a republican executive bodies subordinate to the nature of their activities directly to the President of the Republic of Uzbekistan and is under the status of the Cabinet of Ministers.

In the system of the Ministry of Justice are: the Ministry of Justice of the Republic of Karakalpakstan, the Justice regional administrations and the city of Tashkent, the institution of notaries, civil status records ( registry office ), Tashkent Research Institute of Forensic Expertise ( TashNIISE ), Institute of Judicial Training, Tashkent State law Institute, Tashkent State College of Law, law Lyceum, publishing "Adolat", as well as self-supporting legal aid center .
The Ministry is headed by Minister appointed and dismissed from office in accordance with the Constitution, the President of the Republic of Uzbekistan and then submitted for approval to the Oliy Majlis .

The main and most important task of the Ministry of Justice is to provide a unified state policy in the field of legislation and law enforcement practice.
Building a democratic state of law is impossible without a high and lasting authority of the law . This truth lies at the heart of policy renewal and progress . Rule of law, obedience to him the legislative, executive and judicial powers - precondition operation of law. That Constitution, laws must be above any authority . Without this condition can not be formed people's confidence in the inviolability of their rights, to create a society of personal and economic freedom.
In 2011, special attention was paid consistent democratic renewal and further liberalization of all spheres of society, in particular, social, economic, political, legal sphere . In this regard, an important guide to action is put forward by the President November 12, 2010 at the joint session of the Oliy Majlis of the Concept of further deepening democratic reforms and formation of civil society in the country.

This Concept suggestions for practical implementation documents establishing new legal mechanisms to further strengthen the role of judicial authorities in compliance with the law and the rule of law . We can say that these proposals were the beginning of a new phase of the judicial authorities .
With the adoption of Decree of the President of the Republic of Uzbekistan "On measures for further improvement of the Ministry of Justice of the Republic of Uzbekistan" dated August 23, 2011 to improve even more work in this direction . In this Resolution Regulations defines the role of the Ministry of Justice to improve governance and public administration .

In accordance with the decree of the President " On measures to further enhance the role of judicial authorities in ensuring the legitimacy of the state bodies " from June 17, 2011 established new mechanisms for the implementation of the system for monitoring and controlling the activities of the law enforcement agencies of government, local authorities, law enforcement and regulatory bodies. The system formed by the Ministry of Justice General Directorate for monitoring compliance with legislation and its territorial offices .

Creating this structure served as an important step towards the implementation outlined in the Concept of priority - the rule of law in the activities of public authorities, law enforcement and regulatory authorities, as well as the establishment of their system of checks and balances.

Tasks, functions and rights

The main tasks of the Ministry are
 providing a unified state policy in the area of law and practice;
 protecting human rights and freedoms enshrined in the Constitution and laws, the full development of civil society, to strengthen their legal frameworks;
 coordination of government agencies on legal advocacy aimed at increasing legal awareness and legal culture in society and strengthening the rule of law;
 improving the efficiency of logistical and financial support of the courts, strengthening their real independence and autonomy, the establishment of effective mechanisms for enforcement of judicial acts and other public bodies;
 implementation of state regulation and efficiency of notaries, lawyers, civil registry offices and other structures in the field of legal services to citizens and legal entities;
 promoting entrepreneurship, protection of rights and legitimate interests of businesses and private property owners, foreign investors and enterprises with foreign investments;
 provision of legal assistance to business entities in the negotiation and execution of commercial contracts, strengthening contractual discipline;
 ensuring compliance with the law in the registration of legal entities, including non-profit organizations;
 providing, together with relevant government agencies effective legal protection of the interests of the Republic of Uzbekistan in the field of international legal relations;
 training of lawyers and improving their skills to meet modern requirements and standards;
 realization of management system of organs and institutions of justice.

The main functions of the Ministry are
- Function Part I: in a unified state policy in the area of law and practice:

1. In the field of training and legal expertise of laws and regulations:
 coordinates and implements guidance activities of government in matters of legislation ;
 develops priorities for improvement of legislative activity, ensure their implementation ;
 performs preliminary coordination issues need to prepare draft laws by the Government;
 develops on the instructions of the President of Uzbekistan, the Cabinet of Ministers on its own initiative and draft laws and other legal acts, changes and additions to them and submit them for consideration in due course;
 Assignments by the Cabinet of Ministers shall consider and summarize the proposals of government and public authorities on the preparation of draft laws ;
 conducts legal review of draft laws and other legal acts and gives opinion on their compliance with the Constitution and laws of Uzbekistan, as well as the rules of legislative technique;
 developing proposals to bring legislation into conformity with the Constitution and laws of the Republic of Uzbekistan, on ensuring consistency and integrity of the   legal regulation, analyzes and summarizes proposals to improve legislation and submits them to the President of Uzbekistan and the Government of Uzbekistan, has been working on the codification of the law;
 maintains regular working relationship with the chambers of the Oliy Majlis of Uzbekistan, their Kenghashes, committees and commissions ;

2. In departmental rule making:
 conducting state registration of legal acts of ministries, state committees and departments having an obligatory character;
 leads the state register of departmental legal acts;
 supervises the work of ministries, state committees and agencies to implement the established order of their adoption, state registration, publication and bringing to the attention of interested persons of legal acts, as well as for their application;
 informs the public about the state of the state registration of legal acts of ministries, state committees and agencies;

3. Systematization of legislation in the field of:
 carries out the state registration of legal acts of the Republic of Uzbekistan and the work on the systematization of legislation;
 leads control copies laws of the Republic of Uzbekistan, resolutions and other acts of the Oliy Majlis, decrees, decisions and orders of the President of the Republic of Uzbekistan, decrees and orders of the Cabinet of Ministers, legal acts of ministries, state committees and departments of the Republic of Uzbekistan;
 Bank forms (fund) of legal acts of the Republic of Uzbekistan;
 implementing development official classifier branches of legislation of the Republic of Uzbekistan, on the basis of the classifier assigns codes normative legal acts;
 determines the rules of systematic accounting legislation in government and public authorities in the field and oversees their implementation;

- Function Part II: in the field of protection of human rights and freedoms enshrined in the Constitution and laws:
 performs ongoing analysis of legislation in the field of human rights and make suggestions for its improvement;
 studying international experience and proposals for the implementation of international legal norms in the current legislation of the Republic of Uzbekistan;
 developing measures to improve the legal knowledge of the population in the area of human rights and freedoms, promote the idea of respect for human rights in the society;
 analyzes and summarizes the state of compliance with the legislation in the field of human rights and makes proposals to the relevant authorities for their improvement;
 Seeks to strengthen the role of lawyers in protecting human rights and freedoms, the development of civil society and strengthen the legal framework;
 interacts with the Oliy Majlis of the Republic of Uzbekistan for Human Rights (Ombudsman) and the National Centre for Human Rights of Uzbekistan, including in the field of monitoring compliance with human rights and freedoms;
 provides objective and comprehensive review of individual complaints about violations of their constitutional rights and freedoms, it takes on the measures in accordance with the law;

- Function Part III: in the coordination of government agencies on legal advocacy:
 analyzes the state of legal advocacy and legal education, develops proposals for their improvement ;
 organizes the promotion of legal knowledge among the public, aimed at improving the legal awareness and legal culture in society and strengthening the rule of law;
 organizes methodological support of educational work in the field of law, develops recommendations for the introduction of modern forms of legal education and training ;
 developing plans and organizes the publication of legal textbooks, teaching aids for students and students of higher and secondary special and vocational educational institutions, collections of legal acts, as well as non-fiction and other legal literature ;
 develop and implement programs and activities to improve the legal information society ;
 organizes introduction of software and hardware tools and technologies for collecting, processing and analysis of legal information for enforcement and justice institutions ;
 take measures to ensure enforcement and justice institutions necessary legislative materials ;
 organizes the establishment and maintenance of national database legislation of Uzbekistan, in the prescribed manner provides access to her legal and natural persons ;
 carries interstate exchange of legal information ;
 organizes the official publication of codes and compilations of legislative acts, including the official source of publication of legal acts " Collection of Laws of the Republic of Uzbekistan " ;
 provides coordination of the activities of government, public authorities in the field, as well as businesses and individuals for the publication of legal acts, the creation of electronic databases of legislation;
 about
 Defines together with relevant government bodies publish and disseminate the rules of legal acts, the creation of electronic databases of legislation, take measures to ensure their implementation;

- Function Part IV: in logistical and financial support of the courts, as well as ensuring the performance of judicial acts and other public bodies:
 developed taking into account the needs of the ships offer their funding ;
 ensure effective disbursement of funds allocated for the construction and repair of court buildings, the creation of appropriate conditions for the operation of ships;
 organizes work to ensure the safety of judges and judicial processes;
 cooperates with law enforcement and other agencies in ensuring the activities of vessels to strengthen their real independence and autonomy ;
 creates enforcement mechanisms of judicial acts and other public bodies ;

- Function Part V: in the sphere of state regulation in the field of legal services:

1. On the organization of activities of the notary and civil registration:

 opens and eliminates public notary offices, establishes and abolishes the office of a notary; 
 responsible for licensing of notaries; 
 maintains a register of public notaries and notary offices, private practice; 
 determines the order of probation trainee notary procedure for issuing licenses for the notary activity, according to the provisions on the qualification and Appeals Commission; 
 authenticates the signatures of notaries and their impressions printing documents for use abroad, perform other functions related to the activities of notaries; 
 exercises in the prescribed manner of the execution control notaries professional duties, including rules notarial documentation, analyzes and summarizes their work; 
 approve the rules of the notarial documentation, instructions on how to notarial acts notaries public notaries and notary engaged in private practice, chairmen (elders) of citizens' towns, villages and villages, registries registration form notarial acts of identification labels and certificates, exercise other powers provided Law of the Republic of Uzbekistan "On Notary"; 
 organize the registration of civil status acts, directs and controls the activities of the registry office; 
 organize, reorganize and liquidate the Registry Office, verifies, analyzes and summarizes their work;  
 receive are measures to increase the level of legal services to citizens from officers of the registrar and notary; 
 approve samples of forms of vital records; 
 provides the Registry Office and consular offices of the Republic of Uzbekistan to foreign states stationery stamp certificates strict accountability; 
 develops and approves regulations governing the activities of notaries and registry offices, as well as provide guidance and methodological explanations for these bodies;

2. Development of advocacy and legal services:

 defines together with the Republican public association of lawyers powers and organization of activities qualifying commissions; 
 together with the republican public association of lawyers approve the composition of the High Qualification Commission of Advocates; 
 issues licenses lawyers and state registration law offices, colleges and companies; 
 maintains a register of lawyers and law firms, colleges and businesses; 
 provides technical assistance and facilitate the activities of lawyers' offices, colleges, businesses and the Higher Qualification Commission of Advocates; 
 studies and distributes positive experience of lawyers; 
 assists in the implementation of measures to improve the skills of defense lawyers; 
 take measures to protect lawyers from harassment, unreasonable restrictions and harassment in connection with their professional activities; 
 monitors compliance with legislation governing the legal profession, the rules of legal ethics, as well as for the training of lawyers; 
 claims forms and sets deadlines statistical reporting law offices, colleges and companies to the judicial authorities; 
 implementing measures for the organization and development of legal services; 
 coordinating legal work in public and business administration, public authorities in the field, companies, institutions and organizations that develop recommendations for its improvement;  
 checks and analyzes the practice of setting legal work takes measures to eliminate shortcomings and dissemination of positive experience of the legal services of state and economic management, public authorities in the field, companies, institutions and organizations, as well as to improve the skills of legal advisers, conducting their certification;

List of Ministers (1970-present)
 Mamlakat Vasikova (1970-1984) 
 Naman Burikhodzhaev (1984-1985)
 Bakhodir Alimjanov (1985-1990)
 Muhamed-Babir Malikov (1991-1993)
 Alisher Mardiev (1993-1995)
 Sirojiddin Mirsafoev (1995-2000)
 Abdusamat Polvon-Zoda (2000-2005)
 Buritosh Mustafaev (2005-2006)
 Foziljon Otakhonov (2006-2007)
 Ravshan Mukhitdinov (2007-2011)
 Nigmatilla Yuldashev (2011-2015)
 Muzrob Ikromov (2015-2017)
 Ruslanbek Davletov (2017–2022)
 Akbar Toshkulov (2022–present)
Current Administration

Anti-Bribery Compliance Certificate ISO

September 9, 2020 the Ministry of Justice of the Republic of uzbekistan became the first government body in Uzbekistan that complied with the international standard ISO 37001:2016 “Anti-corruption Management System” in all areas of activity, and therefore, was added to the international rating and received a certificate.

See also

 Justice ministry
 Politics of Uzbekistan

References

External links
 

Government of Uzbekistan
Justice
Law enforcement in Uzbekistan